Ian Russell may refer to:

Ian Russell (soccer) (born 1975), American soccer player
Ian Russell (rugby league) (born 1965), Australian rugby league player
Ian Russell, 13th Duke of Bedford (1917–2002), British peer and writer
Ian Russell (priest) (1934–2021), Archdeacon of Coventry and Honorary Chaplain to the Queen

See also
Iain Russell (born 1982), Scottish footballer